Image Composite Editor is an advanced panoramic image stitcher made by the Microsoft Research division of Microsoft Corporation.

The application takes a set of overlapping photographs of a scene shot from a single camera location and creates a high-resolution panorama incorporating all the source images at full resolution. The stitched panorama can be saved in a wide variety of file formats, from common formats like JPEG and TIFF to multi-resolution tiled formats like HD View and Deep Zoom, as well as allowing multi-resolution upload to the Microsoft Photosynth site. It can also be saved to a web page with a zoomable viewer using a third-party template.  As of 2021 the program is no longer available for download from Microsoft though it can be found on various other sources.

Features
Stitching algorithms automatically place source images and determine panorama type
Advanced orientation adjustment view allows planar, cylindrical, and spherical projections
Support for different types of camera motion
Panorama stitching from video
Exposure blending using Microsoft Research fast Poisson algorithm
Automatic lens vignette removal
Automatic cropping to maximum image area
Optional automatic completion of missing image parts (helpful for sky, clouds, grass, gravel etc.)
No image size limitation - stitch Gigapixel images
Constrained assembly of image sets taken on a known regular grid, e.g. with a Gigapan head
Native support for 64-bit operating systems
Support for exporting the results to HD View, Deep Zoom, TIFF, JPEG, PNG and layered Photoshop file formats
Panorama publishing to Microsoft Photosynth

However, Microsoft ICE currently does not provide any anti-ghosting-mechanism, like other panorama stitching programmes do, e.g. the open source programme Hugin (software) and various commercial applications.

See also
Microsoft Research
Windows Live Photo Gallery

References

External links
Microsoft Research ICE
Windows Live Photo and Video Blog - Official Windows Live Photo Gallery team blog

Windows-only freeware
Photo software
Photo stitching software
Panorama photography
Image Composite Editor
Free photo stitching software